One Bad Habit is a vocal album by Michael Franks, released in 1980 by Warner Bros. Records. It was Franks' sixth studio album and the first to receive significant radio play in the United States.

Critical reception
A review in the May 3, 1980, issue of Billboard lauded Franks's "cool, airy harmonies gliding over his silky melodylines [sic]" and noted that the songs "He Tells Himself He's Happy" and "Still Life" are reminiscent of Paul Simon's "I Do It for Your Love" and "Still Crazy After All These Years" because of their "understated lyrical beauty." (Later in 1980 Simon released One-Trick Pony, his follow-up to 1975's Still Crazy After All These Years as well as the soundtrack album to the film of the same name, written by and starring Simon; in his review for Rolling Stone magazine, Stephen Holden referred to the tracks "That's Why God Made the Movies" and "Oh, Marion" as "lighter exercises in the hip-jive style of Michael Franks.")

Track listing

Charts

Personnel

Musicians
Michael Franks - vocals, rhythm arrangements, BVG arrangements
Ray Armando - percussion (1, 3), congas (3)
Dennis Belfield - bass (2-6, 9)
Lenny Castro - percussion (2, 5, 7)
André Fischer - rhythm arrangements, percussion (2, 5, 6, 9), tambourine (4), drums (5, 6, 8, 9)
Clare Fischer - string arrangements (2), conductor (2)
Eric Gale - guitar (4, 6, 9)
Eddie Gómez - acoustic bass (8)
Don Grolnick - fender rhodes (1, 7), clavinet (7), acoustic piano (8)
Jerry Hey - horns section, horn arrangements (1, 3, 5) conductor (1, 3, 5)
Neil Jason - bass (1, 7)
Rick Marotta - drums (1-4, 7)
Hugh McCracken - guitar (3)
George Sopuch - rhythm guitar (4), electric guitar (4)
David Spinozza - guitar (1, 7), acoustic guitar (2, 8), electric guitar (2, 8), rhythm guitar (6)
Tennyson Stephens pianos (2), acoustic piano solo (2), fender rhodes (3-6, 9), clavinet (3), acoustic piano (9)
Larry Williams - horn section, synthesizers (4, 6), synthesizer arrangements (4), horns arrangements (6, 7, 9), conductor (6, 7, 9)
Rick Zunigar - guitar (3), acoustic guitar (4)
Bill Reichenbach Jr. - horn section, horn arrangements (6), conductor (6)
Larry Hall - horn section
Kim Hutchcroft - horn section
Silvia Shemwell, Yolande Howard, Petsye Powell - background vocals (1, 9)

Support
Art direction – Peter Whorf
Photography – Fred Valentine
Recording and mixing – Al Schmitt

References

Bibliography

Michael Franks (musician) albums
1980 albums
Albums produced by Tommy LiPuma
Warner Records albums

Albums recorded at Capitol Studios